Armin, Prince of Lippe (Armin Leopold Ernst Bruno Heinrich Willa August Fürst zur Lippe; 18 August 1924 – 20 August 2015, also in Detmold) was the fourth son of Leopold IV, Prince of Lippe, from his second wife, Princess Anna of Ysenburg and Büdingen.

Head of the House of Lippe

Armin succeeded his father as head of the House of Lippe following the latter's death on 30 December 1949. On 22 March 1953, he renounced his position in favour of his older half brother, Prince Leopold. This move proved controversial within the house, and several princes started legal proceedings. Prince Leopold later in 1958 renounced the headship in favour of his older brother, Hereditary Prince Ernst. Later in that year, the Hereditary Prince called a family council, where it was agreed by the princes in attendance that the oldest prince living in Germany would be head of the house. So the position went to Prince Simon Casimir (1900–1980).

Although agreeing at the time, Prince Ernst August of Lippe, the son of Prince Julius Ernst of Lippe-Biesterfeld and Duchess Marie of Mecklenburg, later changed his mind, believing that all princes of house, not just those living in Germany, should be considered. He ultimately assumed the headship of the house. Ernst August died in 1990 and his son Prince Friedrich Wilhelm of Lippe (b. 1947) has continued his claim. Prince Armin, who said he did not think his decision in 1953 was irrevocable, also claimed to be head of the house, given the fact that he inherited the family fortune, including farming land, forests and the princely castle at Detmold, where he was living.

He was a first cousin of Prince Bernhard of Lippe-Biesterfeld, consort of Queen Juliana of the Netherlands, and was a child attendant at their 1937 wedding.

Marriage and children
Prince Armin married Traute Becker (16 February 1925 – 25 February 2023), daughter of Gustav Becker and Charlotte Meyer, on 27 March 1953, in Göttingen, Germany, in a civil marriage followed by a religious ceremony on 29 March 1953, in Celle, Lower Saxony, Germany. They had a son:
 Stephan, Prince of Lippe, born on 24 May 1959.

Ancestry

References

External links
Schloss Detmold 

 

 

1924 births
2015 deaths
People from Detmold
House of Lippe
Princes of Lippe
Officers Crosses of the Order of Merit of the Federal Republic of Germany
Sons of monarchs